Events from the year 1360 in China.

Incumbents
 Yuan dynasty – Ukhaghatu Khan Toghon Temür

Events 
 Red Turban Rebellion
Zhu Yuanzang (the future Hongwu Emperor, leading the faction known as "Ming", fought a protracted war against the faction of Chen Youliang for supremacy over the former territories controlled by the Red Turbans

References

China
14th century in China